The Groveland train depot is a historic depot building in Groveland, Florida. The rail line that serviced the station was originally built by the Orange Belt Railway and was later acquired by the Atlantic Coast Line Railroad. The station is now empty. It is located on the northwest corner of State Road 19 and westbound State Road 50.

References

Atlantic Coast Line Railroad stations
Transportation buildings and structures in Lake County, Florida